The 1973 Australian Indoor Championships was a men's tennis tournament played on indoor hard courts at the Hordern Pavilion in Sydney, Australia. It was part of the 1973 Commercial Union Assurance Grand Prix as a Group B category tournament. It was the inaugural edition of the tournament and was held from 4 November through 11 November 1973. Rod Laver won the singles title and the accompanying $10,000 first-prize money.

Finals

Singles

 Rod Laver defeated  John Newcombe 3–6, 7–5, 6–3, 3–6, 6–4
 It was Laver's 14th title of the year and the 50th of his career.

Doubles

 Rod Laver /  John Newcombe defeated  Mal Anderson /  Ken Rosewall 7–6, 6–2
 It was Laver's 13th title of the year and the 49th of his career. It was Newcombe's 10th title of the year and the 48th of his career.

References

External links
 ITF – tournament edition details

 
Australian Indoor Championships
Australian Indoor Tennis Championships
Indoor
Australian Indoor Championships
Sports competitions in Sydney
Tennis in New South Wales